Mukim Kiudang is a mukim in Tutong District, Brunei. The population was 5,924 in 2016.

Geography 
The mukim is located in the eastern part of Tutong District, bordering Mukim Keriam to the north, Mukim Pengkalan Batu (in Brunei-Muara District) to the north-east, Sarawak in Malaysia to the south-east, Mukim Lamunin to the south, Mukim Tanjong Maya to the west and Mukim Pekan Tutong to the north-west.

Demographics 
As of 2016 census, the population was 5,924 with  males and  females. The mukim had 1,039 households occupying 1,003 dwellings. The entire population lived in rural areas.

Villages 
As of 2016, the mukim comprised the following census villages:

References 

Kiudang
Tutong District